"Melancholy Elephants" is a  science fiction short story  by American-Canadian writer Spider Robinson, published  in 1982.

The story examines the interaction of copyright and longevity, and the possible effects of the extension of copyright to perpetuity.

Its title is a reference to claims that elephants "never forget".

Plot summary
A woman desperately tries to convince a powerful senator to oppose perpetual copyright—because the fate of humanity is at stake.

Reception
"Melancholy Elephants" won the 1983 Hugo Award for Best Short Story.

References

External links

Text of Melancholy Elephants at the Baen Free Library
 Melancholy Elephants, by Spider Robinson in his site.

1983 short stories
Science fiction short stories
Hugo Award for Best Short Story winning works
1980s science fiction works